The 1996–97 Tulsa Golden Hurricane men's basketball team represented the University of Tulsa as a member of the Missouri Valley Conference during the 1996–97 college basketball season. The Golden Hurricane played their home games at the Tulsa Convention Center. Led by head coach Steve Robinson, they finished the season 24–10 overall and 12–4 in conference play to finish second in the WAC Mountain division standings. After losing in the championship game of the WAC tournament, the team defeated Boston University in the opening round of the NCAA tournament, before falling to No. 4 seed Clemson in the round of 32.

Roster

Schedule and results

|-
!colspan=9 style=| Regular season

|-
!colspan=9 style=| WAC Tournament

|-
!colspan=9 style=| NCAA Tournament

Rankings

Awards and honors
Shea Seals – Third-team All-American, First-team All-WAC

References

Tulsa Golden Hurricane men's basketball seasons
Tulsa
Tulsa Golden Hurricane men's b
Tulsa Golden Hurricane men's b
Tulsa